These are the New Territories East results of the 1998 Hong Kong legislative election. The election was held on 24 May 1998 and all 5 seats in newly established constituency New Territories East where consisted of North District, Tai Po District, Sai Kung District and Sha Tin District were contested. The Frontier became the largest victors by winning two seats with Emily Lau and Cyd Ho, which was followed by the Democratic Party's Andrew Cheng. The Democratic Alliance for the Betterment of Hong Kong also won a seat with Lau Kong-wah and independent Andrew Wong won the last seat, defeating Liberal Party chairman Allen Lee.

Overall results
After election:

Candidates list

See also
Legislative Council of Hong Kong
Hong Kong legislative elections
1998 Hong Kong legislative election

References

1998 Hong Kong legislative election